Emamzadeh Ebrahim may refer to:
 Emamzadeh Ebrahim, Ardabil
 Emamzadeh Ebrahim, Gilan
 Emamzadeh Ebrahim, Lorestan
 Emamzadeh Ebrahim, Razavi Khorasan